Colonia San Jose Chihuahua is an ejido in the municipality of Julimes, in the northern Mexican state of Chihuahua.

References

Populated places in Chihuahua (state)